Boris Koltsov (born 10 September 1988) is a Russian darts player who plays in events of the Professional Darts Corporation (PDC).

Career

BDO
In September 2014, Koltsov reached the semi-finals of the WDF Europe Cup beating Jeffrey Van Egdom, Remco van Eijden, Thomas Junghans, Daniel Larsson and Ross Montgomery along the way before losing to Darius Labanauskas 6–3. He also reached the last 16 of the Romanian Open.

PDC
Koltsov won the Russian Qualifying Event for the 2015 PDC World Championship and beat Haruki Muramatsu of Japan 4–2 in legs in the preliminary round. He squared his first round match with Kevin Painter at 1–1 in sets, but could not win another leg after this to be defeated 3–1. He teamed up with Aleksei Kadochnikov to represent Russia at the World Cup of Darts and they lost 5–1 to Australia in the first round. Koltsov's bid to reach the 2016 World Championship was ended at the semi-final stage by Aleksandr Oreshkin. He dominated the Eurasian Darts Tour in 2016 by winning four and losing in one final of the six events staged. Kolstov and Oreshkin were defeated 5–3 by the Netherlands in the opening round of the World Cup, with world number one Michael van Gerwen praising Kolstov's play afterwards.

He won the Russian qualifier for the 2017 World Championship, but lost 2–1 to Dragutin Horvat in the preliminary round. Kolstov entered Q School in a bid to earn a PDC Tour Card. He reached the last 16 on day two, but this was not enough to earn him a place on the tour. Koltsov and Aleksandr Oreshkin met Australia in the second round of the World Cup after seeing off Hong Kong 5–3 in the first round. Oreshkin beat Kyle Anderson 4–2, but Koltsov failed to win against Simon Whitlock meaning a doubles match was required to settle the tie. Russia easily won 4–0 to make it through to the quarter-finals for the first time, where they could only pick up one leg in their singles defeats to the Welsh pair of Gerwyn Price and Mark Webster.

Koltsov won a PDC Tour Card for the first time at European Qualifying School on 17 February 2021.

World Championship results

PDC
 2015: First round (lost to Kevin Painter 1–3)
 2017: Preliminary round (lost to Dragutin Horvat 1–2)
 2019: First round (lost to Chris Dobey 0–3)
 2020: First round (lost to Ritchie Edhouse 1–3)
 2022: Second round (lost to Dirk van Duijvenbode 2–3)

Performance timeline

BDO

PDC

References

External links
 

Russian darts players
1988 births
Living people
PDC World Cup of Darts Russian team
Professional Darts Corporation former tour card holders